The title Vatanitawake is the  (chiefly title) of Viwa Island, Yasawa, Fiji. Early inhabitants of Vatanitawake were from Waya and settled in Yakani and then Yawalevu. The descendants of the first settlers were of the direct lineage of Maikeli Vukuwale, the chief of Viwa born in the year 1850. Chief Maikeli Vukuwale's son was Isei Tokovou born in 1893 who gave the Tui Viwa title to Semisi Ravusou on the condition that Ravusou and his family remain part of the Methodist Church of Fiji and Rotuma. However, the sons of Ravusou were converted to Catholicism so the title of Tui Viwa automatically reverted to the descendants of Maikeli Vukuwale. Serupepeli Koroitaiti is the current holder of the Tui Viwa title.

See also

Culture of Fiji

References

Fijian culture
Fijian nobility
Ba Province